The Dengying Formation is an upper Ediacaran (551-541 Ma) fossiliferous geologic formation found in South China. It was deposited on a shallow marine carbonate platform.

Members
Listed by ascending age:
 The Hamajing Member is characterized by light grey, medium- to thick-bedded dolomite, intercalated with thin layers of chert.
 The Shibantan Member is interpreted to represent a subtidal environment and is composed of dark grey, thin-bedded bituminous limestone. It is the most fossiliferous of the Dengying Formation members and has yielded several trace fossils, such as Lamonte.
 The Baimatuo Member consists of light grey, thick-bedded dolomite.

Traditionally, the Tianzhushan Member was considered to be the uppermost unit of the Dengying Formation. However, its small shelly fossils and Micrhystridium-like acritarchs are a shared characteristic with the Cambrian Yanjiahe Formation.

Genera
 Cloudina
 Paracharnia
 Sinotubulites
 Yangtziramulus

Ichnogenera
 Helminthoidichnites
 Lamonte
 Torrowangea

See also
 List of fossiliferous stratigraphic units in China
 Ediacaran biota

References

Geologic formations of China
Phosphorite formations
Cambrian northern paleotemperate deposits
Paleontology in China